The Times Square Building is an Art Deco skyscraper designed by Ralph Thomas Walker of the firm Voorhees, Gmelin, and Walker located in Rochester, New York, United States. At , it is the eighth-tallest building in Rochester, with 14 floors.
These structures are among the most distinctive features of the Rochester skyline. The trompe-l’oeil style is used for the decor throughout the building's interior and features various depictions of stylized wheat in reference to Rochester's presence as "the flour city". The building originally hosted a Depression era mural by Carl William Peters (1897-1980) on exhibit from its opening that was later destroyed.

The cornerstone of this bank was laid on October 29, 1929, "Black Tuesday" of the 1929 stock market crash.

References

See also
List of tallest buildings in Rochester, New York

Skyscraper office buildings in Rochester, New York
Art Deco skyscrapers
Office buildings completed in 1930
Art Deco architecture in Rochester, New York